Moweaqua Township is located in Shelby County, Illinois. As of the 2010 census, its population was 2,003 and it contained 899 housing units.

Geography

Adjacent townships 
 South Macon Township, Macon County (north)
 Milam Township, Macon County (northeast)
 Penn Township (east)
 Pickaway Township (southeast)
 Flat Branch Township (south)
 Assumption Township, Christian County (southwest)
 Prairieton Township, Christian County (west)
 Pleasant View Township, Macon County (northwest)

Demographics

References

External links
City-data.com
Illinois State Archives

Townships in Shelby County, Illinois
Townships in Illinois